Miguel Jerónimo Bento Martins Pires (born July 16, 1984) is a Portuguese former swimmer, who specialized in freestyle events. He is a single-time Olympian (2004), and a member of Louletano Desporte Clube, under head coaches Luis Cardoso and Julio Borja.

Pires qualified for the men's 4×200 m freestyle relay, as a member of the Portuguese team, at the 2004 Summer Olympics in Athens. Teaming with Luís Monteiro, Adriano Niz, and João Araújo in heat one, Pires swam an anchor leg in a split of 1:50.71, but the Portuguese team finished the race in seventh place and fourteenth overall with a national record of 7:27.99.

References

1984 births
Living people
Olympic swimmers of Portugal
Swimmers at the 2004 Summer Olympics
Portuguese male freestyle swimmers
People from Faro, Portugal
Sportspeople from Faro District